Carlos Bravo Expósito (born 14 January 1993) is a Spanish footballer who plays for Cultural y Deportiva Leonesa as a right winger.

Club career
Bravo was born in Madrid, and finished his formation with Real Madrid. He made his senior debut with the C-team on 13 May 2012, starting in a 2–3 Tercera División home loss against CF Trival Valderas.

Bravo continued to appear in the fourth division the following six campaigns, representing CDC Moscardó, AD Parla, Internacional de Madrid, CD Móstoles URJC and UB Conquense. On 6 August 2018, after a period on trial at CF Rayo Majadahonda, he signed for AD Unión Adarve in Segunda División B.

On 28 December 2018, Bravo joined SD Ponferradina still in the third division. He contributed with five goals in 17 appearances for the club during the campaign, helping in their return to Segunda División after three years.

Bravo made his professional debut on 25 August 2019, starting in a 1–1 home draw against Real Zaragoza. The following 18 February, he was loaned to CF Rayo Majadahonda until the end of the season, as a cover to injured Iago Díaz.

On 5 October 2020, Bravo terminated his contract with Ponfe, and agreed to a contract with third tier side Cultural y Deportiva Leonesa just hours later.

References

External links
 Carlos Bravo at Real Madrid (archived) 
 
 
 

1993 births
Living people
Footballers from Madrid
Spanish footballers
Association football wingers
Segunda División players
Segunda División B players
Tercera División players
Real Madrid C footballers
CD Móstoles URJC players
Internacional de Madrid players
UB Conquense footballers
SD Ponferradina players
CF Rayo Majadahonda players
Cultural Leonesa footballers
Primera Federación players
Real Unión footballers